Rudchenko is a Ukrainian surname. Notable people with the surname include:

 Panas Rudchenko, real name of Panas Myrny (1849–1920), Ukrainian writer
 Valentina Rudchenko (born 1955), Russian politician

See also
 

Ukrainian-language surnames